Desmodium molliculum, called manayupa or pata de perro in Peru, is a perennial herb in the pea family, Fabaceae.

Uses 
In Peru it is used in traditional medicine for wound healing and its antiinflammatory and antiseptic properties.

References

molliculum
Flora of Peru